Jinhua Park is a park in Da'an District, Taipei, Taiwan.

History
The park was established in 1998.

Transportation
The park is accessible within walking distance south of Dongmen Station of Taipei Metro.

See also
 List of parks in Taiwan
 List of tourist attractions in Taiwan

References

External link

1998 establishments in Taiwan
Parks established in 1998
Parks in Taipei